Ambersham Common is a  biological Site of Special Scientific Interest south-east of Midhurst in West Sussex. It is a Nature Conservation Review site, Grade 2. 

This site is mainly heathland with a wide range of invertebrates, including three nationally rare species. There are also areas of bog and acid carr. It has a diverse variety of bird species, including some which are rare, such as nightjars, woodlarks and Dartford warblers.

Roads and footpaths cross the common.

References

Sites of Special Scientific Interest in West Sussex
Nature Conservation Review sites